Stefan Noesen (born February 12, 1993) is an American professional ice hockey player currently playing for the  Carolina Hurricanes of the National Hockey League (NHL).

Playing career
Noesen grew up playing hockey in the Dallas suburbs; one of his childhood teammates was future Devils teammate Blake Coleman. He eventually moved north at age 14 and ended up playing major junior hockey with the Plymouth Whalers of the Ontario Hockey League. He was selected by the Senators with the first round draft pick, which the team obtained from the Nashville Predators in exchange for forward Mike Fisher. He signed an entry level contract with Ottawa on December 29, 2011.

Noesen made the Team USA lineup for the 2013 World Junior Ice Hockey Championships but was not allowed to participate in the tournament. At the time, he was serving a 10-game OHL suspension for a charging incident and the IIHF honored the suspension. A few weeks later, following the resolution of the 2012–13 NHL lockout, Noesen was invited to the Senators' training camp held in Ottawa. He failed to make the Senators' lineup and on January 16, 2013, was returned to junior to play for the major junior team Plymouth Whalers.

On July 5, 2013, Noesen was traded to the Anaheim Ducks along with forward Jakob Silfverberg and a first-round pick in the 2014 draft in exchange for forward Bobby Ryan. On December 7, 2016, Noesen scored his first NHL goal.

In the midst of his longest tenure in the NHL during the 2016–17 season, Noesen was placed on waivers by the Ducks after 2 goals in 12 games. On January 25, 2017, Noesen was claimed off waivers from Anaheim by the New Jersey Devils. On July 26, 2017, the Devils re-signed Noesen to a one-year, two-way contract worth $660,000.

Noesen had a career-high in points the following season, scoring a total of 13 goals and 27 points in 72 games; he was one of several improved players on the team who helped the Devils reach the playoffs for the first time since their Stanley Cup Finals appearance in 2012. His performance improvement earned him another one-year extension with the Devils, which was worth $1.725 million.

On June 25, 2019, Noesen was not tendered a qualifying offer to remain with the Devils, releasing him as a free agent. On September 3, Noesen agreed to attend the Dallas Stars' training camp on a professional tryout. Noesen remained with the team to play for his home state club through the pre-season before he was released by the Stars.

On October 4, 2019, Noesen signed a one-year, American Hockey League (AHL) contract with the Wilkes-Barre/Scranton Penguins. After scoring 22 points in as many games with the club, he signed a one-year, two-way contract with the Pittsburgh Penguins on December 2. In his debut on December 4, Noesen scored in a 3–0 win over the St. Louis Blues. After being waived by the Penguins, he was claimed by the San Jose Sharks on December 19, 2019. He made his debut two days later against the St. Louis Blues, scoring a goal in a 2–5 loss. On October 9, 2020, he re-signed with the Sharks on a one-year deal.

During the  season, on April 11, 2021, Noesen was traded to the Toronto Maple Leafs along with Nick Foligno in a three-team deal in which the Columbus Blue Jackets received Toronto's 2021 first-round draft pick and 2022 fourth-round draft pick, and the Sharks received Toronto's 2021 fourth-round draft pick.

As a free agent following his brief tenure within the Maple Leafs organization, on July 31, 2021, the Carolina Hurricanes signed Noesen to a one-year, $750,000 contract. Following a successful AHL season and Calder Cup win with the Chicago Wolves, the Hurricanes re-signed him to a 2-year deal.

Personal life
Noesen married his fiancée Alyson in July 2018.

Career statistics

Awards and honors

References

External links

1993 births
American expatriate ice hockey players in Canada
American men's ice hockey right wingers
Anaheim Ducks players
Carolina Hurricanes players
Chicago Wolves players
Ice hockey people from Texas
Living people
National Hockey League first-round draft picks
New Jersey Devils players
Norfolk Admirals players
Ottawa Senators draft picks
Pittsburgh Penguins players
Plymouth Whalers players
San Diego Gulls (AHL) players
San Jose Barracuda players
San Jose Sharks players
Sportspeople from Plano, Texas
Toronto Maple Leafs players
Toronto Marlies players
Wilkes-Barre/Scranton Penguins players